The Odd Fellows Cemetery in Starkville, Mississippi is a historic,  African-American cemetery that was listed on the National Register of Historic Places in 1990.

Odd Fellows Cemetery is one of the oldest African American cemeteries in Mississippi. It was founded by lodge number 2948 of the Grand Order of Odd Fellows of America. Burials began in the 19th century, but permanent markers were not in use until the 1920s. In 1939 the Odd Fellows Lodge sold the cemetery to National Funeral Home, a white-owned company that continued to operate it as an African-American cemetery. The property has changed several times since then.

See also
 List of Odd Fellows cemeteries
 National Register of Historic Places listings in Oktibbeha County, Mississippi

References

External links
 
 

African-American cemeteries
Geography of Oktibbeha County, Mississippi
Odd Fellows cemeteries in the United States
Cemeteries on the National Register of Historic Places in Mississippi
National Register of Historic Places in Oktibbeha County, Mississippi